The MCST R500S is a 32-bit system-on-a-chip, developed by Moscow Center of SPARC Technologies (MCST) and fabricated by TSMC.

MCST R500S Highlights
implements the SPARC V8 instruction set architecture (ISA)
dual-core
the two cores can work in redundancy to increase reliability of the system.
core specifications:
in-order, single-issue 
5-stage integer pipeline
7-stage floating-point pipeline
16 KB L1 instruction cache 
32 KB L1 data cache
shared 512KB L2 cache
integrated controllers:
memory
PCI
RDMA (to connect with other MCST R500S)
MSI (Mbus and SBus)
EBus
PS/2 
Ethernet 100
SCSI-2
RS-232
500 МHz clock rate
130 nm process
die size 100 mm2
~45 million transistors
power consumption 5W

References
 "https://web.archive.org/web/20151101211823/http://www.mcst.ru/b_18-19.shtml" (In Russian)

SPARC microprocessors
32-bit microprocessors